Kei'Trel Clark (born March 19, 2001) is an American football cornerback. He played college football at Liberty and Louisville.

High school career
Clark attended Manchester High School in Midlothian, Virginia. He committed to Liberty University to play college football.

College career
Clark appeared in 13 games and made seven starts as a true freshman at Liberty in 2019. He recorded 38 tackles and one sack. After the season, he entered the transfer portal citing "racial insensitivity" within the program as the reasoning. He transferred to the University of Louisville and was granted immediate eligibility. In 2021, he played in eight games before suffering a season-ending torn ACL. During his three years at Louisville, he had 127 tackles, five interceptions, one touchdown and one sack. After the 2022 season, he declared for the 2023 NFL draft.

References

External links
Louisville Cardinals bio

2001 births
Living people
Players of American football from Virginia
American football cornerbacks
Liberty Flames football players
Louisville Cardinals football players